Louis Moreau (1883–1958) was a French wood-engraver, anarchist and militant pacifist.

References

1883 births
1958 deaths
Anarchist writers
Anarcho-pacifists
French anarchists
French illustrators
French libertarians
French male non-fiction writers
French pacifists
Gustave Moreau